Explosives trace detectors (ETD) are explosive detection equipment able to detect explosives of small magnitude. The detection is accomplished by sampling non-visible "trace" amounts of particulates.  Devices similar to ETDs are also used to detect narcotics. The equipment is used mainly in airports and other vulnerable areas considered susceptible to acts of unlawful interference.

Characteristics

Sensitivity
Detection limit is defined as the lowest amount of explosive matter a detector can detect reliably. It is expressed in terms of nano-grams (ng), pico-grams (pg) or femto-grams (fg) with fg being better than pg better than ng. It can also be expressed in terms of parts per billion (ppb), parts per trillion (ppt) or parts per quadrillion (ppq).

Sensitivity is important because most explosives have a low vapor pressure . The detector with the highest sensitivity is the best in detecting vapors of explosives reliably.

Light weight
Portable explosive detectors need to be as light weight as possible to allow users to not fatigue when holding them. Also, light weight detectors can easily be placed on top of robots.

Size
Portable explosive detectors need to be as small as possible to allow for sensing of explosives in hard to reach places like under a car or inside a trash bin.

Cold start up time and analysis time
The start up time for any trace detector is the time required by the detector to reach the optimized temperature for detection of contraband substances.

Technologies

Colorimetrics 
The use of colorimetric test kits for explosive detection is one of the oldest, simplest, and most widely used methods for the detection of explosives. Colorimetric detection of explosives involves applying a chemical reagent to an unknown material or sample and observing a color reaction. Common color reactions are known and indicate to the user if there is an explosive material present and in many cases the group of explosive from which the material is derived. The major groups of explosives are nitroaromatic explosives, nitrate ester and nitramine explosives, improvised explosives not containing nitro groups which includes inorganic nitrate based explosives, chlorate based explosives, and peroxide based explosives.

Ion mobility spectrometry 
Explosive detection using ion mobility spectrometry (IMS) is based on velocities of ions in a uniform electric field. There are some variant to IMS such as Ion trap mobility spectrometry (ITMS) or Non-linear dependence on ion mobility (NLDM) which are based on IMS principle. The sensitivity of devices using this technology is limited to pg levels. The technology also requires the ionization of sample explosives which is accomplished by a radioactive source such as nickel-63 or americium-241. This technology is found in most commercially available explosive detectors such as the GE VaporTracer, Smith Sabre 4000 and Russian built MO-2M and MO-8. The presence of radioactive materials in these equipments cause regulatory hassles and requires special permissions at customs ports. These detectors cannot be field serviced and may pose radiation hazard to the operator if the casing of the detector cracks due to mishandling. Bi-yearly checks are mandatory on such equipment in most countries by regulating agencies to ensure that there are no radiation leaks. Disposal of these equipments is also controlled owing to the high half-life of the radioactive material used.

Electrospray ionization, mobility analysis (DMA) and tandem mass spectrometry (MS/MS) is used by SEDET (Sociedad Europea de Detección) for the “Air Cargo Explosive Screener (ACES)”, targeted to aviation cargo containers currently under development in Spain.

Thermo redox

This technology is based on decomposition of explosive substance followed by the reduction of the nitro groups. Most military grade explosives are nitro compounds and have an abundance of NO2 groups on them. Explosive vapors are pulled into an adsorber at a high rate and then pyrolized. The presence of nitro groups in the pyrolized products is then detected. This technology has significantly more false alarms because many other harmless compounds also have an abundance of nitro groups. For example, most fertilizers have nitro groups which are falsely identified as explosives, and the sensitivity of this technology is also fairly low. A popular detector using this technology is Scintrex Trace EVD 3000.

Chemiluminescence
This technology is based on the luminescence of certain compounds when they attach to explosive particles. This is mostly used in non-electronic equipment such as sprays and test papers. The sensitivity is pretty low in the order of nanograms.

Amplifying fluorescent polymer
Amplifying fluorescent polymer (AFP) is a promising new technology and is based on synthesized polymers which bind to explosive molecules and give an amplified signal upon detection. When compounds that are not polymers are utilized for such purpose, the quenching of the fluorescence by the traces of explosives is not detectable. When amplifying fluorescent polymer in thin films absorbs a photon of light, excited state polymers (excitons) are able to migrate along the polymer backbone and between the adjacent polymer films. These sensors were originally made in order to detect trinitrotoluene. In AFP, binding of one TNT molecule results in quenching of fluorescence significantly due to the conjugated structure of the polymers.  It has been reported that in practice the polymers result in 100-1000 fold increase of amplification of the quenching response.

"During its excited state lifetime, the exciton propagates by a random walk through a finite volume of the polymer film." Once TNT, or any other electron-deficient (i.e., electron accepting) molecule comes in contact with the polymer, a so-called low-energy ‘trap’ forms. "If the exciton migrates to the site of the bound electron-deficient molecule before transitioning back to the ground state, the exciton will be trapped (a non-radioactive process), and no fluorescence will be observed from the excitation event. Since the exciton samples many potential analyte binding sites during its excited state lifetime, the probability that the exciton will sample an occupied ‘receptor’ site and be quenched is greatly increased."

The explosive trace detectors utilizing AFPs, known as Fido Explosives Detectors, were originally developed under the Defense Advanced Research Projects Agency (DARPA) Dog’s Nose program and is now produced by FLIR Systems. The current generation, provides broad-band trace explosive detection and weighs less than 3 lbs.  The sensitivity is in the order of femtogram (1 × 10−15 grams). This is the only such technology in the field that can achieve such sensitivity.

Mass spectrometry
Recently, mass spectrometry (MS) has emerged as another ETD technology. Adoption of mass spectrometry should lower false alarms rates often associated with ETD due to the higher resolution of the core technology. It also uses a non-radioactive ionization method generally secondary electrospray ionization (SESI-MS).  Primarily used in desktop ETD systems, mass spectrometry can be miniaturized for handheld ETD.

References 

Explosives
Forensic equipment
Detectors